Guido De Rosso (born 28 September 1940) is a retired Italian professional racing cyclist. He won several races in the 1960s and finished seventh at the 1965 Tour de France. He rode the Giro d'Italia in 1962–1965 and finished fourth in 1963 and third in 1964.

References

External links

1940 births
Living people
Italian male cyclists
Cyclists from the Province of Treviso